Neurogenic differentiation 1 (Neurod1), also called β2, is a transcription factor of the NeuroD-type. It is encoded by the human gene NEUROD1.

In mice, Neurod1 expression is first seen at embryonic day 12 (E12).

It is a member of the Neurod family of basic helix-loop-helix (bHLH) transcription factors, composed of Neurod1, Neurod2, Neurod4, and Neurod6. The protein forms heterodimers with other bHLH proteins and activates transcription of genes that contain a specific DNA sequence known as the E-box. It regulates expression of the insulin gene, and mutations in this gene result in type II diabetes mellitus in mouse models and in human clinical patients.

Neurod1 is found to convert reactive glial cells into functional neurons in the mouse brain in vivo In the adult cortex, Neurod1 expression is a marker of mature excitatory pyramidal neurons in the upper-most layers of the cortex.

Interactions 

Neurod1 has been shown to interact with MAP3K10, MAFA and Cyclin D1.

References

Further reading

External links 
 

Transcription factors
Human proteins